Daniel Brochu (born February 28, 1970) is a Canadian actor.

Early life
Brochu came from a single parent family, like his character Buster Baxter on Arthur.

Career
Brochu is best known for voicing Buster Baxter in the PBS TV series Arthur and its spin-off Postcards from Buster, as well as Danny Pickett in later seasons of What's with Andy?.

Personal life
On July 2, 2005, Brochu married Sara Bradeen. He has 2 children.

Filmography

Film
The Legend of the North Wind (1992) - Watuna (voice, English dub)
The Return of the North Wind (1993) - Watuna (voice)
Rainbow (1995) - Tiger Leader
The Drive (1996) - Jim
The Kid (1997) - Trey
Provocateur (1997) - Kurt Spears
Sublet (1998) - The Janitor, The Source
The Bone Collector (1999) - N.Y.U. Student
Arthur's Perfect Christmas (2000) - Buster Baxter (voice)
The Sign of Four (2001) - Wiggins
Pain Relief (2001) -
The Royal Scandal (2001) - Wiggins
Dead Awake (2001) - Pit Bull Owner
Arthur: It's only Rock 'N Roll (2002) - Buster Baxter (voice)
Redeemer (2002) - Joey
The Book of Eve (2002) - Denis Plante
The Favourite Game (2003) - Krantz
See Jane Date (2003) - Rick
See This Movie (2004) - Festival HQ Staffer
Arthur's Missing Pal (2006) (credited as “Conway Bruce”) - Buster Baxter (voice)
Tripping the Rift: The Movie (2008) - 
Out of Control (2009) - Danny
The True History of Puss 'N Boots (2009) - Peter (voice, English dub)
Mr. Nobody (2009) - Peter
Ring of Deceit (2009) - Head Usher
Winx Club 3D: Magica avventura (2010) - Additional voices
Do No Harm (2012) - Detective Gennaro
Edmond Was a Donkey (2012) - Edmond's Second Colleague (voice)
Exploding Sun (2013) - Ivan Zhukov
The Fantastic Bus (2013) - Dan
Beauty (2014) -
Goldfish (2015) - Kyle
Sahara (2017) - Pitt (voice, English dub)
Arthur: D.W. and the Beastly Birthday (2017) - Buster Baxter (voice)
Arthur and the Haunted Tree House (2017) - Buster Baxter (voice)
Sleeper (2018) - Doctor
On the Basis of Sex (2018) - Young Professor
Appiness  (2018) - Chet
 The Rhythm and Roots of Arthur (2020) - Buster Baxter (voice)
 An Arthur Thanksgiving (2020) - Buster Baxter (voice)
 Arthur's First Day (2021) - Buster Baxter (voice)
Felix and the Treasure of Morgäa (Félix et le trésor de Morgäa) (2021) - Felix (English version)

Television
The Little Flying Bears (1990) - Additional voices
Gulliver's Travals (1992) - Rafael (voice)
The Little Lulu Show (1995-1999)- Additional Voices
Sirens (1995) - Jason
The Magical Adventures of Quasimodo (1996) - Quasimodo (voice)
Arthur (1996–2022) - Buster Baxter (voice)
Les exploits d'Arsène Lupin (1996) - Max Leblanc
Are You Afraid of the Dark? (1996) - Joshua
The Hunger (1997–2000) - Kyle, Harry
The Country Mouse and the City Mouse Adventures (1998) - Bongo (voice)
Kit & Kaboodle (1998) - Additional Voices
Rotten Ralph (1999) - Cousin Percy (voice)
Mumble Bumble (1999) - Roc (voice)
Mona the Vampire (1999-2002) - Additional Voices 
Tommy & Oscar (1999) - Additional Voices 
Mega Babies (1999-2000) - Additional Voices 
 Sagwa, the Chinese Siamese Cat (2001-2002) - Cha-Siu Miao (voice)
 Caillou (2000-2003) - Caillette Singer (voice)
 Daft Planet (2002) - Additional Voices
Simon in the Land of Chalk Drawings (2002) - Additional Voices
Wunschpunsch (2001) - Additional Voices
X-DuckX (2001–2005) -
Spaced Out (2002) - Benjamin (voice)
Sacred Ground (2002) - Jimmy
Kid Paddle (2003) - Big Bang (voice)
What's with Andy? (2003–2007) - Danny Pickett (voice)
Naked Josh (2004) - Pretentious Video Artist
Winx Club (2004–2009) - Sky (voice)
Postcards from Buster (2004–2012) - Buster Baxter (voice)
The Tofus (2004–2007) - Additional voices
Franny's Feet (2005–2010) - Additional Voices
Yakari (2005–2014) -
Monster Allergy (2006–2008) - 
Tripping the Rift (2007) -
Les Enfants d'Okura (2007) -
SamSam (2007–2013) - SamDaddy (voice)
Fred's Head (2008) -
My Life Me (2010) - Additional voice
Blue Mountain State (2010) - Aaron Lavey
Supernatural: The Animation (2011) - Ryan, Michael McGregor (voices)
Being Human (2012) - Tommy
19-2 (2014) - Dispatcher, Operator, Clerk (voices)
14 Tagebücher des Ersten Weltkriegs (2014) - Ernst Jünger (voice)
Hot Mom (2014) - Richard Birch
Mohawk Girls (2014) - White Party Guest
H2O: Mermaid Adventures (2015) - Lewis (voice)
Spookley and the Christmas Kittens (2019) - Mistletoe (voice)
Tom Sawyer (2020) - Tom Sawyer

Video games
Evolution Worlds (2002) - Yurka Shadenaught, Carcano's Followers #1
TMNT (2007) - Additional voices
Assassin's Creed III: The Tyranny of King Washington (2013) - Additional voices
Thief - Watchman
Outlast: Whistleblower (2014) - Dennis, Scientists, Guards
Watch Dogs (2014) - Additional voices
Afterlife VR (2019) - Thom

References

External links 
 

Living people
Canadian male child actors
20th-century Canadian male actors
21st-century Canadian male actors
Canadian male voice actors
Canadian male film actors
Canadian male television actors
French Quebecers
Male actors from Montreal
1970 births